1987 Empress's Cup Final was the 9th final of the Empress's Cup competition. The final was played at National Stadium in Tokyo on March 27, 1988. Yomiuri SC Beleza won the championship.

Overview
Yomiuri SC Beleza won their 1st title, by defeating defending champion Shimizudaihachi SC 2–0.

Match details

See also
1987 Empress's Cup

References

Empress's Cup
1987 in Japanese women's football